Antonio Bruno was an Italian painter of the Renaissance period. He was born in Modena or Correggio, and painted at Parma in the manner of Correggio, of whom, if not a pupil, he was a great imitator and contemporary, as one of his works is dated 1530. He painted a Madonna and Saints for the parish church in Santi Senesio e Teopompo, Castelvetro di Modena.

Antonio Bruni refers to both a poet (1593–1635) from Apulia; and also a painter (1767–1825).

References

16th-century Italian painters
Italian male painters
Painters from Parma
Painters from Modena
Italian Renaissance painters
Year of birth unknown
Year of death unknown